Willibald Joseph MacDonald (January 27, 1897 – March 17, 1977) was an educator and political figure on Prince Edward Island. He served as the 19th Lieutenant Governor of Prince Edward Island from August 1963 to October 1969.

He was born in Souris West, the son of Archibald J. MacDonald. MacDonald was educated in Souris, at Prince of Wales College and at Saint Dunstan's University, later becoming a professor at Prince of Wales College. He served overseas during World War I and also served in World War II. MacDonald married Agnes Smith Flynn in 1925.

References 
 The Honourable Willibald Joseph MacDonald, Lieutenant Governor Gallery, Government of Prince Edward Island
 McDonell, JK; Campbell, RB Lords of the North (1997)  p. 263

Lieutenant Governors of Prince Edward Island
1897 births
1977 deaths
People from Souris, Prince Edward Island